The 2018 Listowel Mixed Doubles Cashspiel was a curling event held from March 31 to April 2 at the Listowel Curling Club in Listowel, Ontario as part of the World Curling Tour. The event was held in a round robin format.

Teams
The teams are listed as follows:

Round robin standings
Final round robin standings

Tiebreakers
 R. Husain / F. Husain 7-8  Donnegan / Steep
 Shipmaker / Shinde 1-9  K. Tuck / W. Tuck

Playoffs

References

External links

2018 in Canadian curling
Listowel 2018
Perth County, Ontario